The Monkey's Paw is a 1933 American pre-Code horror film co-directed by Ernest B. Schoedsack (prologue) and Wesley Ruggles, based on the short story, "The Monkey's Paw" (1902) by W. W. Jacobs. The film was considered lost until pictures from it were posted online in 2016; the extant copy is dubbed in French.

Plot

It is a story about a monkey's paw using which three wishes can be granted but with negative consequences. Still Mr and Mrs White used it to get what they needed. They also lost something very valuable as a punishment for tampering with fate.

Cast
Ivan F. Simpson as Mr. White
Louise Carter as Mrs. White
C. Aubrey Smith as Sgt. Maj. Morris
Bramwell Fletcher as Herbert White
Betty Lawford as Rose
Winter Hall as Mr. Hartigan
Herbert Bunston as Sampson
Nina Quartero as Nura
Nigel De Brulier as Hindu Fakir 
J.M. Kerrigan as Cpl. O'Leary

Critical reception
A contemporary review in The International Photographer considered it "greatly handicapped by its unrelenting sombre mood. Even the inevitable happy ending that wags its tale at the end is hardly sufficient to dispel the gloom. The cast is uniformly capable, but the lack of a dominant screen personality is keenly felt...The photography is an example of what can be done with the new supersensitive emulsions using very little light."

References

External links
 
 

1933 films
1933 horror films
American black-and-white films
American horror films
Films based on short fiction
Films based on works by W. W. Jacobs
Films directed by Wesley Ruggles
Films directed by Ernest B. Schoedsack
1930s rediscovered films
Rediscovered American films
1930s English-language films
1930s American films